Hon'ble Thiru. Justice C. V. Karthikeyan is a sitting Judge of the Madras High Court. He is one of the Members of the Board of Governors of the Tamil Nadu State Judicial Academy.

Justice C. V. Karthikeyan was appointed Additional Judge, High Court of Madras on 6 October 2016.

Early life 
Justice C. V. Karthikeyan was born on 14 December 1964. His parents are Sri. C. V. Simharaja Sastri and Smt. Saraswathi S Sastri. Justice Karthikeyan's initial schooling was at St. Joseph's Presentation Convent, Rayapuram, Chennai. Later, Justice Karthikeyan had completed High School from St. Mary's Higher Secondary School, Armenian Street, Chennai and Higher Secondary from Hindu Senior Secondary School, Triplicane, Chennai.

Graduation 
Justice Karthikeyan had completed his B.Sc. Decree and completed his Law Graduation. After completing his Law Decree, Justice Karthikeyan had enrolled himself in the Bar Council of Tamil Nadu and Puducherry.

As judge of High Court 
Justice Karthikeyan was appointed Additional Judge, High Court of Madras on 16 November 2016. He is one of the Members of the Board of Governors of the TNSJA (Tamil Nadu State Judicial Academy).

Important cases 
Some important cases are reported in journals like All India Reporter.

AIADMK Case 
Justice Karthikeyan had passed orders to submit the accounts of the political party AIADMK.

Patanjali's Case 

Justice C.V. Karthikeyan held there was no due cause for Patanjali Ayurved Ltd. and Divya Yog Trust to name their tablets as Coronil. When the case was ordered by Justice C. V. Karthikeyan, the same was appealed by the affected party.

Defamation Case 
Justice C. V. Karthikeyan of the Madras High Court ordered notice to the Youtuber Maridhas answers on the plea filed by M Gunasekaran of TV 18 Broadcast limited.

TNERC Case 
In yet another case, Justice C. V. Karthikeyan had ordered the batch of petitioners to approach the Regulatory Authority for the Electricity Board, if the Board was not following the directions for collecting the charges during pandemic.

Bike Taxi Case 
in an interim order on an appeal moved by Rapido, a bike taxi service provider, Justice Vineeth Kothari and Justice C. V. Karthikeyan stayed the operation of a communication of Tamil Nadu police. The communication was addressed to Google LIC, Apple India and Indian Computer Emergency Response Team (CRET-In) directing them to remove the 'Rapido Bike' app from their platforms.

CGST and Input Tax Case 
In a case relating to the Goods and Services Tax Act, a Bench consisting of Justice C.V. Karthikeyan, ordered on the issue relating to  whether  under Section   50   of   the   CGST  Act,   the   interest  on   delayed  filing   of   the   returns arises automatically or not?

Puducherry Controversy Case 
Justice C. V. Karthikeyan had dismissed Puducherry Chief Minister's writ petition filed against the Lieutenant Governor Kiran Bedi's decision to issue cash instead of goods in fair price shops.

References 

1964 births
Living people
Madras High Court
Judges of the Madras High Court